United States v. Mendenhall, 446 U.S. 544 (1980), was a United States Supreme Court case that determined "seizure" occurs when an officer uses displays of authority to detain a person.

The United States Court of Appeals for the Sixth Circuit heard the appeal of Ms. Sylvia Mendenhall as pertaining to Ms. Mendenhall's alleged unconstitutional seizure by two DEA agents at Detroit Metropolitan Airport. The court ruled against the defendant in a 5–4 majority, though the court's Dissent shows confusion as to the majority vote.

The decision notably set a standard by which a valid consensual stop could be converted into an unconstitutional Terry stop, such as by "the threatening presence of several officers, the display of a weapon by an officer, some physical touching of the person of the citizen, or the use of language or tone of voice indicating that compliance with the officer's request might be compelled."

Background
On the morning of February 10, 1976, Sylvia Mendenhall was walking through the concourse of Detroit Metropolitan Airport after disembarking a commercial flight returning from Los Angeles. During her walk through the airport, she was noticed by two Drug Enforcement Administration (DEA) agents. The two agents grew suspicious, later stating that she appeared to have the characteristics of a person unlawfully transporting narcotics. The agents approached Mendenhall and identified themselves as federal agents. Following procedure, they began to question Ms. Mendenhall; their questions included, "How long were you in California?" to which she responded by stating that hers was a short, two-day trip. The agents later asked her to present identification and an airline ticket. She presented her driver’s license and the airline ticket to the agents. The name on the driver’s license said “Sylvia Mendenhall”, yet the name on the airline ticket was “Annette Ford”.  Upon questioning, she responded, “[I] just felt like using that name.” "Agent Anderson then specifically identified himself as a federal narcotics agent and, according to his testimony, the respondent "became quite shaken, extremely nervous. She had a hard time speaking." The agents requested that the respondent accompany them to the DEA office at the Airport; she did so willingly. At the office, the agents asked for permission to inspect her handbag and her person and informed her of her right to decline. She responded, "Go ahead," while handing her purse to the agent. A female police officer arrived at the office to conduct the search. The officer also proclaimed that the respondent had the right to decline to the search. When asked to remove her clothes, she explained that she had a flight to catch, but was assured that if she had no narcotics on her, that there would be no issues. Without further comments, she began to disrobe. Two packages were found beneath her undergarments and were handed to the policewoman. One package appeared to contain an illegal substance. The respondent was arrested for possession of heroin. The United States District Court for the Eastern District of Michigan denied the motion to suppress the evidence. The court concluded that the agents' actions were permissible in investigating suspicion of criminal activity. The respondent voluntarily accompanied the agents to the DEA office. The court convicted Sylvia Mendenhall. The court of appeals reversed the decision, stating that the respondent did not properly consent to the search.

Drug-courier profile as testified by DEA Agent

"The agent Manuel Lopez testified that the respondent's behavior fit the 'drug courier profile'—an informally compiled abstract of characteristics thought typical of persons carrying illicit drugs. In this case, the agents thought it relevant that (1) the respondent was arriving on a flight from Los Angeles, a city believed by the agents to be the place of origin for much of the heroin brought to Detroit; (2) the respondent was the last person to leave the plane, 'appeared to be very nervous,' and 'completely scanned the whole area where [the agents] were standing'; (3) after leaving the plane, the respondent proceeded past the baggage area without claiming any luggage; and (4) the respondent changed airlines for her flight out of Detroit."

Conflict

The issue requesting clarification was whether or not the respondent's Fourth Amendment rights were violated. The court failed to construct a majority defining "seizure". Whether or not the respondent voluntarily consented to the search or was coerced into it, there is sufficient evidence that the respondent was given the option to go on her way. According to Justice Stewart, evidence that the respondent was not asked to go to the DEA office with the agents is not enough to dismiss that the respondent gave consent. There was no evidence of force, and the respondent's voluntary accompanying the agents is sufficient to side with the District Court. Evidence that she was a 22-year-old Black woman with no high school diploma and was being apprehended by White agents, though not completely irrelevant, was held as not being decisive evidence.

The Fourth Amendment serves "to prevent arbitrary and oppressive interference by enforcement officials with the privacy and personal security of individuals." United States v. Martinez-Fuerte, 428 U.S. 543, 554. As long as the person being questioned has the right to disregard the questions and has the right to vacate, then a search does not impede on a person's liberty or privacy. Police questioning is an effective manner of enforcing criminal law. The questioning of Sylvia Mendenhall furthered the compelling interest of the DEA. "Without such investigation, those who were innocent might be falsely accused, those who were guilty might wholly escape prosecution, and many crimes would go unsolved. In short, the security of all would be diminished." Schneckloth v. Bustamonte, 412 U.S. at 225. Because the respondent was not held by force and could have walked away, she was not technically "seized" by the DEA agents. Since there is no constitutionally protected interest in regard to the "seizure" of a person, we are left with the precedent in Terry v. Ohio. In  Terry, a police officer identified himself and the three gentlemen in question mumbled something leading Officer McFadden to believe they were dangerous. The officer grabbed Terry and threw Terry between the officer and the other two suspects. Terry was lawfully "seized" under the impression he was dangerous. In this case, Terry was unable to walk away and forced to a search. Based on the precedent provided by Terry, the search and seizure of Mendenhall was lawful.

Historical significance

State v. Cook, 107 Ohio App. 3d 154 (1995)

"Applying United States v. Mendenhall, defendant was seized when four officers approached and ordered [the defendant's] companion, then the defendant, to step out of [the defendant's] parked truck."

United States v. Drayton (2002)

In United States v. Mendenhall, the court determined that "seizure" occurs when an officer  uses physical force or displays authority to detain a person. In United States v. Drayton, the court determined that the Fourth Amendment does not govern consensual encounters. In Drayton, a police officer identified himself and asked a passenger on the bus if the police had consent to perform a drug and illegal weapon search. Another officer stood at the front of the bus but did not block the exit. The court ruled that this did not violate constitutional rights.

Based on Mendenhall case, a law enforcement officer publicly approaching an individual and asking such individual questions is not a violation of the individual's Fourth Amendment rights. As long as the officer does not imply that compliance is mandatory, the officer may question or ask to examine the identification of an individual.

Powell's Concurrence
"Mr. Justice Powell, with whom the Chief Justice and Mr. Justice Blackmun join, concurring in part and concurring in the judgment.

"I join Parts I, II-B, II-C, and III of the Court's opinion. Because neither of the courts below considered the question, I do not reach the Government's contention that the agents did not "seize" the respondent within the meaning of the Fourth Amendment. In my view, we may assume for present purposes that the stop did constitute a seizure. I would hold—as did the District Court—that the federal agents had reasonable suspicion that the respondent was engaging in criminal activity, and, therefore, that they did not violate the Fourth Amendment by stopping the respondent for routine questioning."

White's Dissent
"Mr. Justice White, with whom Mr. Justice Brennan, Mr. Justice Marshall, and Mr. Justice Stevens join, dissenting.

"The Court today concludes that agents of the Drug Enforcement Administration (DEA) acted lawfully in stopping a traveler changing planes in an airport terminal and escorting her to a DEA office for a strip-search of her person. This result is particularly curious because a majority of the Members of the Court refuse to reject the conclusion that Ms. Mendenhall was "seized," while a separate majority decline to hold that there were reasonable grounds to justify a seizure. Mr. Justice Stewart concludes that the DEA agents acted lawfully, regardless of whether there were any reasonable grounds for suspecting Ms. Mendenhall of criminal activity, because he finds that Ms. Mendenhall was not "seized" by the DEA agents, even though, throughout the proceedings below, the Government never questioned the fact that a seizure had occurred necessitating a [display] of antecedent reasonable suspicion. Mr. Justice Powell's opinion concludes that, even though Ms. Mendenhall may have been "seized," the seizure was lawful, because her behavior while changing planes in the airport provided reasonable suspicion that she was engaging in criminal activity. The Court then concludes, based on the absence of evidence that Ms. Mendenhall resisted her detention, that she voluntarily consented to being taken to the DEA office, even though she, in fact, had no choice in the matter. This conclusion is inconsistent with our recognition that consent cannot be presumed from a showing of acquiescence to authority, and it cannot be reconciled with our decision last Term in Dunaway v. New York, 442 U.S. 200 (1979)."

Summary of Dissent
Mr. Justice White's reason for dissent is based on the contradiction that the majority does not refute that a "seizure" did occur, while at the same time a majority was unable to justify that the "seizure" was necessary. Mr. Justice Powell strongly believes that Ms. Mendenhall was forced into the search, even though there is a lack of evidence that she did not have the opportunity to leave.

References

Further reading

External links
 

United States Supreme Court cases
United States Fourth Amendment case law
1980 in United States case law
United States Supreme Court cases of the Burger Court
Drug Enforcement Administration litigation
Detroit Metropolitan Airport